The Barmera railway line was the second railway built to develop the Murray Mallee region of South Australia, in 1913. It followed the success of the Pinnaroo railway line in 1906. Both lines branched east from Tailem Bend to the north of the main Melbourne–Adelaide railway. The Brown's Well line was the more northerly, and extended into country which had not been developed much before the railway, partly due to the absence of any viable transport route for produce. The original terminus of the Brown's Well railway was at Meribah, not far from the Victorian border.

Such was the optimism about this region, that three lines from the Brown's Well line to the Murray River, and an additional line between it and the Pinnaroo line, were approved even before it was completed. It was extended further to Renmark and Barmera in the 1920s, along with construction of another spur from Wanbi to near Moorook in 1925.

Route
The initial sidings and mileages from Adelaide were:—Tailem Bend, 75¼ miles; Naturi, 84½; Kulde, 89½; Wynarka, 95¼; Karoonda, 105¼; Lowalde, 111½; Borrika, 115½; Halidon, 128¼; Wanbi, 139¼; Alawoona, 151¾; Paruna, 164¾; Meribah, 172.
As the locomotives were powered by steam, reliable water supplies were required as well. There are no significant rivers or lakes in the Mallee, so government bores and tanks were required. The following bores were available on the Brown's Well railway: Yalwarra bore, at 14½ miles (bad water, not suitable for railway use); Wynarka, 20 miles; Karoonda, 29 miles 66 chains; Borrika, 40 miles; Sandalwood, 47 miles 43 chains; Halidon, 55 miles 19 chains; Crecy, 58 miles 20 chains; Wanbi, 64 miles 60 chains; Cobera, 71 miles; Alawoona, 76 miles, 22 chains; Wolowa, 84 miles; Meribah, 96 miles 64 chains. The bores were situated at an average distance of 7 miles apart.

Part of the Brown's Well railway line plus most of the Loxton railway line spur from Alawoona were converted to standard gauge and remained as the Loxton railway line, used to carry part of the seasonal grain harvest. The rest of the line and branches were closed. The Loxton line closed on 20 July 2015, with all grain traffic now taken by road.

Extensions
The extension was approved before the original length had been completed, with an additional cost estimate of £135,750 to serve an additional . The official opening to Paringa was on 2 October 1913. The intervention of World War I delayed the construction of the Paringa Bridge to extend the railway to Renmark until 1927. It later was also extended to Barmera with the first passenger service running on 1 August 1928.

In the 1960s, a branch line was built which joined the main line south of Paringa, near the Wonuarra siding. It was built to support construction of the proposed Chowilla Dam. The dam construction was cancelled in 1967 and never built. The railway line was removed without ever being used.

See also
Rail transport in South Australia#Branches from the Melbourne line

References

Closed railway lines in South Australia